Jesse Brock (born July 18, 1972, in Decatur, Illinois) is a bluegrass artist who plays the mandolin and supplies both lead and supporting vocals.  He records and tours with the East Tennessee based Authentic Unlimited Band, which made their stage debut on February 19, 2022, in Asheville, North Carolina.  In May 2022, Authentic Unlimited released their first two albums on the Billy Blue record label.  

Jesse's second solo recording entitled "Streamliner" was released in July 2021 by Sound Biscuit Productions. 

Jesse resides in Franklin, Tennessee, with his wife Kristine.  Over a career in excess of 35 years, Jesse previously performed with The CW Brock Family, Lynn Morris Band, Chris Jones & the Nightdrivers, Michael Cleveland & Flamekeeper, Audie Blaylock and Redline, The Gibson Brothers and Fast Track.

In November of 2018, Jesse Brock announced that he would be leaving The Gibson Brothers after playing with them for 5 years.

Discography 

 2002: Kickin' Grass (Pinecastle)
2021: "Streamliner" (Sound Biscuit Productions)

Awards

Individual
2009 IBMA Mandolin Player of the Year

2015 IBMA Mandolin Player of the Year

Group
2009 IBMA Instrumental Band of the Year (Michael Cleveland & Flamekeeper)
2009 IBMA Instrumental Recorded Performance of the Year ("Jerusalem Ridge" with Michael Cleveland & Flamekeeper)
2008 IBMA Instrumental Band of the Year (Michael Cleveland & Flamekeeper)
2007 IBMA Instrumental Band of the Year (Michael Cleveland & Flamekeeper)

References

External links 

www.jessebrock.com

www.authenticunlimitedband.com

1972 births
American country singer-songwriters
American bluegrass musicians
Living people
American bluegrass mandolinists
Musicians from Decatur, Illinois
Singers from Maine
Songwriters from Maine
Singer-songwriters from Illinois
Country musicians from Illinois
Country musicians from Maine
21st-century American singers